Yelva is a genus of moths in the subfamily Arctiinae. It contains the single species Yelva obscura, which is found in Nigeria.

References

Endemic fauna of Nigeria
Lithosiini